Bunnell Incorporated is a medical equipment company founded in 1980. The first and most famous product by Bunnell is the Life Pulse Ventilator, the first high-frequency ventilator approved by the U.S. Food and Drug Administration (FDA) for clinical use in 1988.

History 
Bunnell Incorporated was established in 1980 with the help of the University of Utah's Innovation Center, which is a project funded by the National Science Foundation. In 1982, the company began clinical trials for the Life Pulse Ventilator at five key medical centers in Utah, Arizona, Minnesota, Pennsylvania, and Florida.

In 1985, the company treated almost 100 infants, then submitted "12 copies of nearly thousand-page application to the FDA for approval." The application was rejected and continued to be rejected for three years, the company was under a $2 million debt. On June 30, 1988, the FDA approval was granted.

References 

Electronics companies of the United States
Manufacturing companies based in Salt Lake City
1980 establishments in Utah
Electronics companies established in 1980